Yhing Sawheny is a Thai researcher, academic administrator & Deputy Director of International Affairs at Siam University. She is also former International Executive Officer at International Association of University presidents.

Books
 The Promise Of Higher Education
 Smart City 360

References

Year of birth missing (living people)
Living people
Yhing Sawheny